Tawfik, or Tewfik, is an Arabic masculine given name. The name is derived from the Arabic root: waaw-faa-qaaf, which means to agree or to reconcile. Tawfik translates to, "the ability or opportunity to achieve success". A spelling of Tewfik or Toufic is used more among French speakers. Tawfik can be used as a given name or surname. Since it is considered a "neutral" name in the Arabic language, many Arabic-speaking Christians as well as Muslims are named Tawfik. The Turkish equivalent is Tevfik, the Azerbaijani equivalent is Tofig or Tofiq, the Albanian equivalent is Tefik, the Bosnian equivalent is Teufik. The Hebrew equivalent is Tovik or Tuvik. Tawfik has a similar meaning to the Greek Tobias. Taoufik and Toufic are common in North Africa (Morocco, Tunisia and Algeria).



Given name

Taoufik 

 Taoufik Makhloufi
 Taoufik Hicheri
 Taoufik Rouabah
 Taoufik Salhi
 Taoufik Maaouia
 Taoufik Bouachrine
 Taoufik Mehedhebi
 Taoufik Chobba
 Taoufik Charfeddine
 Taoufik Baccar
 Taoufik Djemail
 Taoufik Ben Othman
 Taoufik Belbouli
 Taoufik Ben Brik

Tawfik
 Tawfiq Ali (born 1990), Palestinian footballer 
 Tawfik Abu Al-Huda, also known as Tawfik Pasha Abul-Huda) (1894–1956), Jordanian politician, served several terms as Prime Minister of Jordan
 Tawfik Hamid (born 1961), Egyptian author
 Tawfik Jaber (died 2008), Palestinian chief of police in Gaza 
 Tawfik Khatib (born 1954), Israeli Arab politician who served as a member of the Knesset
 Tawfik Toubi (1922–2011), Israeli Arab communist politician

Taufic
 Taufic Guarch (born 1991), Mexican footballer of Lebanese descent

Taufik
 Taufik Akbar (born 1951), Indonesian engineer and former astronaut candidate
 Taufik Batisah (born 1981), Singaporean singer 
 Taufik Hidayat (born 1981), Indonesian badminton player
 Taufik Hidayat (footballer, born 1993), Indonesian footballer
 Taufik Hidayat (footballer, born 1999), Indonesian footballer

Taufiq
 Taufiq Ahmed (cricketer), Pakistani cricketer for the Pakistan Air Force
Taufiq Ismail (born 1935), Indonesian poet, activist and the editor
 Taufiq Kiemas (1942–2013), Indonesian Speaker of the People's Consultative Assembly of Indonesia from 2009 to 2013
 Taufiq Qureshi (born 1962), Indian classical musician
 Taufiq Wahby (1891–1984), Kurdish writer, linguist and politician

Tawfiq
 Tawfiq Bay or Sayyid Ahmad Tawfiq Bay Sharif Efendi or Tevfik Pasha, Syrian Arab traveler
 Tawfiq Canaan (1882–1964), Palestinian physician, medical researcher, ethnographer, and Palestinian nationalist
 Tawfiq al-Hakim (1898–1987), Egyptian writer and visionary
 Tawfiq Al-Nimri (1918–2011), Jordanian singer and composer
 Tawfiq al-Suwaidi (1892–1968), Iraqi politician who served as 5th Prime Minister of Iraq on three occasions stretching from 1929 to 1950
 Tawfiq Ziad (1929–1994), Palestinian politician well known for his "poetry of protest"

Tewfik
 Tewfik Pasha (1852–1892), also known as Tawfiq of Egypt, Khedive of Egypt and the Sudan between 1879 and 1892 and the sixth ruler from the Muhammad Ali Dynasty
 Ahmed Tewfik El Madani (1899–1983), Algerian nationalist leader and a minister of the GPRA
 Mohammed Ali Tewfik (1875–1955), the heir presumptive of Egypt and Sudan from 1892–99 and 1936–1952
 Tewfik Allal (born 1947), Moroccan writer and a prominent political figure
 Tewfik Pasha (Tawfiq of Egypt) (1852–1892), Khedive of Egypt and Sudan between 1879 and 1892
 Tewfik Saleh (1926–2013), Egyptian film director and writer
 Tewfik Mishlawi (1935–2012), Lebanese journalist
 Tewfik Allal (born 1947), Moroccan writer and political figure
 Tewfik Abdullah (born 1896), Egyptian footballer

Toufic
 Toufic Aboukhater (born 1934), Monaco-based Palestinian/Lebanese billionaire businessman
 Toufic El Bacha (1924–2005), Lebanese composer and musician
 Toufic Farroukh, Lebanese jazz composer, working in France
 Toufic El Hajj, Lebanon international rugby league footballer
 Majid Toufic Arslan, titled Emir Majid Arslan (1908–1983), Lebanese Druze leader, politician, Mp and minister and head of the Arslan feudal Druze ruling family
 Toufic Jaber
 Toufic Barbir
 Toufic H. Kalil House
 Toufic Maatouk
 Toufic Ali

Toufik
 Toufik Benedictus "Benny" Hinn (born 1952), Israeli-born Christian televangelist
 Toufik Benamokrane (born 1980), Algerian footballer
 Toufik el-Hibri (1869–1954), Lebanese Muslim cleric, one of the primary founders of the Scout movement in Lebanon
 Toufik Zerara (born 1986), Algerian footballer

Tefik
 Tefik Mborja (1891–1954), Albanian politician and lawyer
 Tefik Osmani (born 1985), Albanian footballer

Tevfik
 Tevfik Akbaşlı (born 1962), Turkish composer
 Tevfik Altındağ (born 1988), Turkish footballer
 Tevfik Başer (born 1951), Turkish-German film director and screenwriter
 Tevfik Esenç (1904–1992), last known speaker of the Ubykh language
 Tevfik Fikret (1867–1915), Turkish poet
 Tevfik Gelenbe (1931–2004), Turkish actor
 Tevfik Köse (born 1988), Turkish footballer
 Tevfik Kış (born 1934), Turkish wrestler
 Tevfik Odabaşı (born 1981), Turkish wrestler
 Tevfik Rüştü Aras (1883–1972), Turkish politician

Tofig
 Tofig Bakikhanov, Azerbaijani composer 
 Tofig Guliyev (1917–2000), Azerbaijani composer, pianist, conductor
 Tofig Gasimov (1938–2020), Azerbaijani politician and diplomat
 Tofig Huseynzade (1946–2006), Azerbaijani philologist, folklorist, journalist and poet
 Tofig Ismayilov (film director) (1939–2016), Azerbaijani film director, screenwriter and film scholar
 Tofig Ismayilov (politician) (1933–1991), Azerbaijani politician, administrator, first Secretary of State of Azerbaijan
 Tofig Zulfugarov, Azerbaijani politician and government minister

Tofiq
 Tofiq Bahramov (1925–1993), Soviet footballer and football referee from Azerbaijan

Others
 Toufik Benedictus "Benny" Hinn (born 1952), Benny Hinn, Israeli Christian pastor and revivalist
 Tufi Duek (born 1954), Brazilian fashion designer
 Taufeeq Umar (born 1981), Pakistani cricketer
 Servet Teufik Agaj, Albanian footballer
 Taoufik Makhloufi (born 1988), Algerian track and field athlete

Surname

Taoufik 

 Sami Taoufik, Moroccan racing driver

Tawfik
 Abdel Nasser Tawfik (born 1967), Egyptian physicist
 Abdelaziz Tawfik (born 1986), Egyptian footballer
 Ahmed Tawfik, Egyptian footballer
 Ahmed Tawfik (basketball) (born 1987), Egyptian basketball player
 Ahmed Khaled Tawfik (born 1962), Egyptian SF, horror and medical thriller writer
 Anwar Tawfik (born 1914), Egyptian Olympic fencer
 Ehab Tawfik (born 1966), Egyptian singer
 Hassan Hosni Tawfik (1911–2005), Egyptian Olympic fencer

Tawfiq
 Hisham Tawfiq (born 1970), American actor

Toufic
 Jalal Toufic, Lebanese artist, filmmaker, and author
 Walid Toufic (born 1954), Lebanese singer and actor

Tewfik
 Samira Tewfik (born 1944), Lebanese singer

Taufiq
 Pervez Taufiq (born 1974), American vocalist and songwriter for the hard rock band Living syndication

See also
Tawfiq (magazine), weekly satirical magazine published between 1922 and 1971 in Iran
Port Tewfik, the old name of Suez Port
Port Tewfik Memorial (Indian War Memorial) was originally situated at Port Tewfik on the Suez Canal
SV Toufic El Rahman, Syrian sailing ship sunk by the German submarine U-77, east of Cape Greco, Crete 
Toufic H. Kalil House, structure built by Frank Lloyd Wright in Manchester, New Hampshire

Arabic masculine given names
Arabic-language surnames